The Lanham (Trademark) Act (codified at  et seq. is the primary federal trademark statute of law in the United States. The Act prohibits a number of activities, including trademark infringement, trademark dilution, and false advertising.

History
Named for Representative Fritz G. Lanham of Texas, the Act was passed on July 5, 1946, and signed into law by President Harry Truman, taking effect "one year from its enactment", on July 6, 1947. In rare circumstances, a conflict will arise between trademarks that have been in use since before the Lanham Act went into effect, thus requiring the courts to examine the dispute according to the trademark act that existed before the Lanham Act.

The Act has been amended several times since its enactment. Its impact was significantly enhanced by the Trademark Counterfeiting Act of 1984, which made the intentional use of a counterfeit trademark or the unauthorized use of a counterfeit trademark an offense under Title 18 of the United States Code, and enhanced enforcement remedies through the use of ex parte seizures and the award of treble profits or damages (whichever is greater).

In 1999, the Anticybersquatting Consumer Protection Act inserted , and amended .

Civil enforcement
§§ 42 and 43 of the Act (now known as ) set out the remedies that can be sought when a trademark is infringed. These provisions forbid the importation of goods that infringe registered trademarks, and restrict, through the use of injunctions and damages, the use of false descriptions and trademark dilution.

§ 43(a) is the "likelihood of confusion" standard for infringement of an unregistered trademark or trade dress, and courts still frequently refer to the provision as "Section 43(a)":

 is often used when false or misleading statements are alleged to have hurt a consumer or business.  The claimant must prove that a false or misleading statement was made in commerce and that the statement creates a likelihood of harm to the plaintiff.

 is often used when false or misleading statements are alleged to have hurt a business.

Jurisprudence

The Act has been held to have extraterritorial impact, and the circuit courts have been giving more favorable interpretations in extending its scope. The original ruling by the Supreme Court of the United States, as interpreted by the United States Court of Appeals for the Second Circuit, contemplates a three-part test in determining whether the Act applies (where at least two factors must be met):

the conduct of the defendant must have a substantial effect on United States commerce,
the defendant must be a United States citizen, and
there must be an absence of conflict with foreign law.

Although the Lanham Act sets out clear parameters as to what constitutes trademark infringement, subsequent court decisions, especially those involving the Internet, have loosened the strictures.

In 2003, the U.S. Supreme Court ruled that the law had no impact on public domain works in Dastar Corp. v. Twentieth Century Fox Film Corp.

In 2014, the various interpretations that had been adopted by the circuit courts as to who had standing to sue under  were ousted by the Court in Lexmark Int'l v. Static Control Components, where Justice Scalia adopted a multi-step approach:

Under Article III, the plaintiff must have suffered or be imminently threatened with a concrete and particularized "injury in fact" that is fairly traceable to the challenged action of the defendant and likely to be redressed by a favorable judicial decision.
AGC requires the ascertainment, as a matter of statutory interpretation, of the "scope of the private remedy created by" Congress, and the "class of persons who [could] maintain a private damages action under" a legislatively conferred cause of action.
A statutory cause of action extends only to plaintiffs whose interests "fall within the zone of interests protected by the law invoked," and the "zone of interests" formulation applies to all statutorily created causes of action, as it is a "requirement of general application" and Congress is presumed to "legislat[e] against the background of" it, "which applies unless it is expressly negated."
A statutory cause of action is also presumed to be limited to plaintiffs whose injuries are proximately caused by violations of the statute. A plaintiff suing under §1125(a) ordinarily must show that its economic or reputational injury flows directly from the deception wrought by the defendant's advertising; and that occurs when deception of consumers causes them to withhold trade from the plaintiff.
Direct application of the zone-of-interests test and the proximate-cause requirement supplies the relevant limits on who may sue under §1125(a).

In 2014, the U.S. Supreme Court ruled in POM Wonderful LLC v. Coca-Cola Co. that the Act complemented the Food, Drug, and Cosmetic Act, allowing a company to sue for infringement by way of civil action.

In 2017 Matal v.

In 2019 Iancu v.

Divisions
In the United States Code, the Act has been divided into four subchapters:

The Trademark Registers
Subchapter I sets forth the requirements that a mark must meet to receive a registration on the Principal Register, which bestows various rights on the trademark owner to prevent others from infringing their mark. Among the requirements are prohibitions against the registration of marks that are confusingly similar to existing marks, are generic or merely descriptive, are scandalous or immoral, or fall onto certain other prohibited categories. Subchapter I also sets forth certain procedural requirements, such as the submission of an affidavit of continued use after five years of registration.

Subchapter II sets forth a form of registration on the Supplemental Register, for certain marks that are unregistrable under Subchapter I, but may become registrable in the future, such as those that are merely descriptive. This form of registration, while not granting all the protections of registration on the Principal Register, does provide notice to potential infringers that the mark is in use, and also provides some procedural benefits.

See also

International cybercrime

References

Further reading

Journals

Books

External links
The Lanham Act at bitlaw.com
Full text of Lanham Act from Cornell Legal Information Institute

United States federal trademark legislation
False advertising law
United States competition law
1946 in law
79th United States Congress
Intellectual property law